Alexander Kamloop Black (1832 – December 14, 1913) was a political figure in Manitoba. He represented St. Pauls from 1876 to 1878 in the Legislative Assembly of Manitoba.

He was born in Île-à-la-Crosse, the son of Samuel Black and Angelique Cameron. In 1859, Black married Margaret Miller. He was elected to the Manitoba assembly in an 1876 by-election held following the death of Curtis Bird. Black died in San Francisco.

References 

1832 births
1913 deaths
Members of the Legislative Assembly of Manitoba
Canadian Métis people
Métis politicians